At least two Japanese naval ships have been named  :

 , a Tachibana-class destroyer of the Imperial Japanese Navy during World War II
 JDS Shii (PF-17, PF-297), a Kusu-class patrol frigate of the Japan Maritime Self-Defense Force, formerly USS Long Beach (PF-34)

See also
 Shii (disambiguation)

Japanese Navy ship names